The Light is the third studio album by the folk rock band Delta Rae. It was their first album since leaving Big Machine Label Group and was funded by a successful Kickstarter campaign. After an initial goal of $30,000, the crowd-funding campaign raised $451,457, making it the 5th most funded Kickstarter music projects ever. There are plans for a companion album, The Dark, to be released in 2021. Lyric Magazine referred to the album as "It is a joyous, unconstrained, heart-warming piece of work. It’s like going to church, but a church in which the religion is one of music, joy and love. The album is both sonically and spiritually uplifting in a way that puts a great big smile on your face and sends you off on your merry way that bit lighter."

Track listing

Personnel
Elizabeth Hopkins – lead vocals
Brittany Hölljes – lead vocals
Ian Hölljes – guitar, vocals
Eric Hölljes – keyboards, piano, guitar, vocals
Mike McKee – drums, percussion
Grant Emerson – bass guitar

References

2020 albums
Delta Rae albums